HotelOnline is a travel technology company, offering a suite of digital tools for e-commerce, online marketing and operations automation to the hotel industry in Sub-Saharan Africa. The company helps hotels digitize operations and offers managed distribution to online channels, such as Online Travel Agents (OTAs), Global Distribution Systems, and metasearch engines.  HotelOnline partners with Expedia, Booking.com, Hotelbeds, Airbnb and Ctrip

The company is incorporated in Dubai, with offices in Nairobi, Lagos, Kampala, Dakar and Oslo.

Background 
HotelOnline was founded as Savanna Sunrise Ltd. in Dubai in 2014, by Endre Opdal and Håvar Bauck, to facilitate e-commerce and online marketing for hotels in Eastern Africa. After growing rapidly in Kenya, Uganda and Rwanda, in 2015 and 2016, Savanna Sunrise acquired Hotel Online Sp. z.o.o. in Poland in 2017 after the initial collapse of the much-publicized three-way merger talks that also included Hospitality Technology Solutions Ltd (t/a "HotelOga")  in Nigeria. The new group rebranded to HotelOnline later in 2017, and launched their own Nigerian operation.

Later in 2017, HotelOnline raised USD 200,000 in an equity crowdfunding, the first known case of an African technology startup successfully using this funding method.

In May 2018, HotelOnline acquired Senegalese travel technology company Teranga Solutions as part of their expansion into francophone Western Africa. The company at the same time also acquired European Travel Group AS.

In 2019, prominent startup investor Shravan Shroff invested an undisclosed amount in HotelOnline, and joined their Board of Directors. Shroff is known for his role as the first investor in traveltech  unicorn OYO Rooms. Trond Riiber-Knudsen, known as Norway's most active startup investor, also co-invested an undisclosed amount.

In September 2019, as part of their expansion into the Nordic market, HotelOnline acquired the Norwegian operations of Key Butler, a leading Nordic short term apartment rental company.

In 2020, HotelOnline acquired former competitor Africabookings, and the Cloud9 Lifestyle app. This received some notable attention, as HotelOnline was seen as going against the stream when most of the travel industry in Africa was in a crisis.

Technology 
HotelOnline provides a cloud-based suite of tools for automated online distribution and hotel operations, reservations management and AI-driven dynamic pricing.

Presence 
HotelOnline has offices in Nairobi, Kampala, Lagos, Dakar and Oslo. In 2019 the company announced that it had a client portfolio of more than 1500 hotels in 18 markets. With the Africabookings acquisition in 2020, the company claimed to have increased this portfolio by 5000 properties around Africa.

References 

Technology companies of the United Arab Emirates
Travel and holiday companies of the United Arab Emirates
Travel technology